The Belgian order of precedence is the formal ranking used at the Royal court during acts of state. Because the EU, NATO and SHAPE all have their headquarters in Belgium, this list is used every year during formal receptions at court.

A distinction is made between Princes of the Royal blood, and Princes of nobility. The same goes for Cardinals who always have precedence, no matter if they are acting as residing bishop. Members of the royal household are given high positions. Many of the people who occupy these positions also have special privileges in Belgium and have the right to use special car number plates.

List used in 2016 
 the King of the Belgians
 the Queen of the Belgians
 King Albert
 Queen Paola
 the Duchess of Brabant
 the Princes of Royal Blood
 the Belgian Cardinals
 the Dean of the Diplomatic Corps, the Papal Nuncio
 the Ambassadors accredited by the court
 the President of the European Parliament
 the President of the Chamber and the President of the Senate
 the President of the European Council
 the Prime Minister
 the Vice Prime Ministers
 the Federal Ministers
 the President of the European Union
 the Minister for Foreign Affairs (if foreign diplomats are present)
 the President of the European Commission
 the Secretary General of NATO
 the Foreign Minister
 the President of the International Court of Justice in the Hague
 the President of the Court of Justice of the European Union
 the prosecutor General of the Court of Cassation
 the President of the Constitutional Court
 the Presidents of the Parliaments of the Communities and Regions
 the Minister-Presidents of the Communities and Regions
 the Secretaries of State
 the Grand Marshall of His Majesty the King
 the Vice presidents and members of the European Commission
 the Belgian Ministers of State
 the Regional Ministers
 the Ladies in Waiting of the Queen
 the Judges of the International Criminal Court of The Hague
 the Judges and Clerks of the Court of Justice of the European Union
 the Ambassadors to the European Union
 the Ambassadors to NATO
 the President of the Court of Audit (Rekenhof/Cour des comptes)
 the President of the High Council of Justice
 the Noble families of the Blue Room.
 the Dignitaries of the Royal Court
 HM's Chief of Staff
 the Head of HM's Military Household
 the Intendant of HM's Civil List
 The Chief of the Household of the Royal Princes.
 The honorary Chief of Staff of His Majesty.
 The honorary Intendant of His Majesty's Civil List.
 The honorary Head of HM's Military Household.
 The honorary Ladies in Waiting of The Queen
 The President of the Military Committee of NATO.
 the Archbishop of Mechelen-Brussels, if not a Cardinal.
 The Foreign ambassadors of His Majesty
 The Head of Protocol or the Royal Court.
 The Governors of the Provinces
 The Presidents of the Provincial Councils
 The Bishops of the Belgian Church province.
 The Commanders in chief of the Supreme Headquarters Allied Powers Europe.
 The Aide-de-camp of His Majesty.

The official list goes further until 178. Further are mentioned Members of Parliament, Generals, members of the Royal Academies, Burgomasters, ...

See also 
 List of Grand Cordons of the Order of Leopold
 Belgian order of precedence (decorations and medals)

Sources 
 Emmanuel COPPIETERS, Protocol, UGA, Heule, 1988.
 Pierre-Yves MONETTE, Beroep: Koning der Belgen, 2003
 Eddy VAN DEN BUSSCHE, Praktisch Handboek voor het Protocol, UGA, Heule, 2008.
 Eddy VAN DEN BUSSCHE, Manuel pratique pour le protocole, UGA, Heule, 2008.
 Eddy VAN DEN BUSSCHE, Het Protocol in België - Le Protocole en Belgique, UGA, Heule, 2013.

Orders of precedence
Belgian monarchy
Belgium diplomacy-related lists
Belgium and the European Union
Belgium and NATO
Belgium–Holy See relations